A solstice is an event that occurs when the Sun appears to reach its most northerly or southerly excursion relative to the celestial equator on the celestial sphere. Two solstices occur annually, around June 21 and December 21. In many countries, the seasons of the year are determined by the solstices and the equinoxes.

The term solstice can also be used in a broader sense, as the day when this occurs. The day of a solstice in either hemisphere has either the most sunlight of the year (summer solstice) or the least sunlight of the year (winter solstice) for any place other than the Equator. Alternative terms, with no ambiguity as to which hemisphere is the context, are "June solstice" and "December solstice", referring to the months in which they take place every year.

The word solstice is derived from the Latin sol ("sun") and sistere ("to stand still"), because at the solstices, the Sun's declination appears to "stand still"; that is, the seasonal movement of the Sun's daily path (as seen from Earth) pauses at a northern or southern limit before reversing direction.

Definitions and frames of reference 
For an observer at the North Pole, the Sun reaches the highest position in the sky once a year in June. The day this occurs is called the June solstice day. Similarly, for an observer on the South Pole, the Sun reaches the highest position on the December solstice day. When it is the summer solstice at one Pole, it is the winter solstice on the other. The Sun's westerly motion never ceases as Earth is continually in rotation. However, the Sun's motion in declination comes to a stop at the moment of solstice. In that sense, solstice means "sun-standing".

This modern scientific word descends from a Latin scientific word in use in the late Roman Republic of the 1st century BC: solstitium. Pliny uses it a number of times in his Natural History with a similar meaning that it has today. It contains two Latin-language morphemes, sol, "sun", and -stitium, "stoppage".
The Romans used "standing" to refer to a component of the relative velocity of the Sun as it is observed in the sky. Relative velocity is the motion of an object from the point of view of an observer in a frame of reference. From a fixed position on the ground, the Sun appears to orbit around Earth.

To an observer in an inertial frame of reference, planet Earth is seen to rotate about an axis and revolve around the Sun in an elliptical path with the Sun at one focus. Earth's axis is tilted with respect to the plane of Earth's orbit and this axis maintains a position that changes little with respect to the background of stars. An observer on Earth therefore sees a solar path that is the result of both rotation and revolution.

The component of the Sun's motion seen by an earthbound observer caused by the revolution of the tilted axis – which, keeping the same angle in space, is oriented toward or away from the Sun – is an observed daily increment (and lateral offset) of the elevation of the Sun at noon for approximately six months and observed daily decrement for the remaining six months. At maximum or minimum elevation, the relative yearly motion of the Sun perpendicular to the horizon stops and reverses direction.

Outside of the tropics, the maximum elevation occurs at the summer solstice and the minimum at the winter solstice. The path of the Sun, or ecliptic, sweeps north and south between the northern and southern hemispheres. The days are longer around the summer solstice and shorter around the winter solstice. When the Sun's path crosses the equator, the length of the nights at latitudes +L° and −L° are of equal length. This is known as an equinox. There are two solstices and two equinoxes in a tropical year.<ref>For an introduction to these topics of astronomy refer to {{cite book
|title=The American Practical Navigator: an Epitome of Navigation
|first=Nathaniel
|last=Bowditch
|author-link=Nathaniel Bowditch
|publisher=National Geospatial-Intelligence Agency
|location=Bethesda, Maryland
|date=2002
|url=http://msi.nga.mil/MSISiteContent/StaticFiles/NAV_PUBS/APN/Chapt-15.pdf
|access-date=December 9, 2015
|at=Chapter 15 Navigational Astronomy'
|archive-url=https://web.archive.org/web/20160208021807/http://msi.nga.mil/MSISiteContent/StaticFiles/NAV_PUBS/APN/Chapt-15.pdf
|archive-date=February 8, 2016
|url-status=dead
}}</ref>

Relationship to seasons

The seasons occur because the Earth's axis of rotation is not perpendicular to its orbital plane (the plane of the ecliptic) but currently makes an angle of about 23.44° (called the obliquity of the ecliptic), and because the axis keeps its orientation with respect to an inertial frame of reference. As a consequence, for half the year the Northern Hemisphere is inclined toward the Sun while for the other half year the Southern Hemisphere has this distinction. The two moments when the inclination of Earth's rotational axis has maximum effect are the solstices.

At the June solstice the subsolar point is further north than any other time: at latitude 23.44° north, known as the Tropic of Cancer. Similarly at the December solstice the subsolar point is further south than any other time: at latitude 23.44° south, known as the Tropic of Capricorn. The subsolar point will cross every latitude between these two extremes exactly twice per year.

Also during the June solstice, places on the Arctic Circle (latitude 66.56° north) will see the Sun just on the horizon during midnight, and all places north of it will see the Sun above horizon for 24 hours. That is the midnight sun or midsummer-night sun or polar day. On the other hand, places on the Antarctic Circle (latitude 66.56° south) will see the Sun just on the horizon during midday, and all places south of it will not see the Sun above horizon at any time of the day. That is the polar night. During the December Solstice, the effects on both hemispheres are just the opposite. This sees polar sea ice re-grow annually due to lack of sunlight on the air above and surrounding sea.

Cultural aspects

Ancient Greek names and concepts
The concept of the solstices was embedded in ancient Greek celestial navigation. As soon as they discovered that the Earth was spherical they devised the concept of the celestial sphere, an imaginary spherical surface rotating with the heavenly bodies (ouranioi) fixed in it (the modern one does not rotate, but the stars in it do). As long as no assumptions are made concerning the distances of those bodies from Earth or from each other, the sphere can be accepted as real and is in fact still in use. The Ancient Greeks use the term "ηλιοστάσιο" (heliostāsio), meaning stand of the Sun.

The stars move across the inner surface of the celestial sphere along the circumferences of circles in parallel planes perpendicular to the Earth's axis extended indefinitely into the heavens and intersecting the celestial sphere in a celestial pole. The Sun and the planets do not move in these parallel paths but along another circle, the ecliptic, whose plane is at an angle, the obliquity of the ecliptic, to the axis, bringing the Sun and planets across the paths of and in among the stars.*

Cleomedes states:The band of the Zodiac (zōdiakos kuklos, "zodiacal circle") is at an oblique angle (loksos) because it is positioned between the tropical circles and equinoctial circle touching each of the tropical circles at one point ... This Zodiac has a determinable width (set at 8° today) ... that is why it is described by three circles: the central one is called "heliacal" (hēliakos, "of the sun").

The term heliacal circle is used for the ecliptic, which is in the center of the zodiacal circle, conceived as a band including the noted constellations named on mythical themes. Other authors use Zodiac to mean ecliptic, which first appears in a gloss of unknown author in a passage of Cleomedes where he is explaining that the Moon is in the zodiacal circle as well and periodically crosses the path of the Sun. As some of these crossings represent eclipses of the Moon, the path of the Sun is given a synonym, the ekleiptikos (kuklos) from ekleipsis, "eclipse".

English names
The two solstices can be distinguished by different pairs of names, depending on which feature one wants to stress.
 Summer solstice and winter solstice are the most common names, referring to the seasons they are associated with. However, these can be ambiguous since the Northern Hemisphere's summer is the Southern Hemisphere's winter, and vice versa. The Latinate names estival solstice (summer) and hibernal solstice (winter) are sometimes used to the same effect, as are midsummer and midwinter.
 June solstice and December solstice refer to the months of year in which they take place, with no ambiguity as to which hemisphere is the context. They are still not universal, however, as not all cultures use a solar-based calendar where the solstices occur every year in the same month (as they do not in the Islamic calendar and Hebrew calendar, for example).
 Northern solstice and southern solstice indicate the hemisphere of the Sun's location. The northern solstice is in June, when the Sun is directly over the Tropic of Cancer in the Northern Hemisphere, and the southern solstice is in December, when the Sun is directly over the Tropic of Capricorn in the Southern Hemisphere. These terms can be used unambiguously for other planets.
 First point of Cancer and first point of Capricorn refer to the astrological signs that the sun "is entering" (a system rooted in Roman Classical period dates). Due to the precession of the equinoxes, the constellations the sun appears in at solstices are currently Taurus in June and Sagittarius in December.

Solstice terms in East Asia

The traditional East Asian calendars divide a year into 24 solar terms (節氣). Xiàzhì (pīnyīn) or Geshi (rōmaji) is the 10th solar term, and marks the summer solstice. It begins when the Sun reaches the celestial longitude of 90° (around June 21) and ends when the Sun reaches the longitude of 105° (around July 7). Xiàzhì more often refers in particular to the day when the Sun is exactly at the celestial longitude of 90°.

Dōngzhì (pīnyīn) or Tōji (rōmaji) is the 22nd solar term, and marks the winter solstice. It begins when the Sun reaches the celestial longitude of 270° (around December 22) and ends when the Sun reaches the longitude of 285° (around January 5). Dōngzhì more often refers in particular to the day when the Sun is exactly at the celestial longitude of 270°.

The solstices (as well as the equinoxes) mark the middle of the seasons in East Asian calendars. Here, the Chinese character 至 means "extreme", so the terms for the solstices directly signify the summits of summer and winter.

Solstice celebrations

The term solstice'' can also be used in a wider sense, as the date (day) that such a passage happens. The solstices, together with the equinoxes, are connected with the seasons. In some languages they are considered to start or separate the seasons; in others they are considered to be centre points (in England, in the Northern Hemisphere, for example, the period around the northern solstice is known as midsummer). Midsummer's Day, defined as St. Johns Day by the Christian Church, is June 24, about three days after the solstice itself). Similarly December 25 is the start of the Christmas celebration, and is the day the Sun begins to return to the Northern Hemisphere. The traditional British and Irish (often) main rent and meeting days of the year: "the usual quarter days" was at first those of the solstices and equinoxes.

Many cultures celebrate various combinations of the winter and summer solstices, the equinoxes, and the midpoints between them, leading to various holidays arising around these events. During the southern or winter solstice, Christmas is the most widespread contemporary holiday, while Yalda, Saturnalia, Karachun, Hanukkah, Kwanzaa, and Yule are also celebrated around this time. In East Asian cultures, the Dongzhi Festival is celebrated on the winter solstice. For the northern or summer solstice, Christian cultures celebrate the feast of St. John from June 23 to 24 (see St. John's Eve, Ivan Kupala Day), while Modern Pagans observe Midsummer, known as Litha among Wiccans. For the vernal (spring) equinox, several springtime festivals are celebrated, such as the Persian Nowruz, the observance in Judaism of Passover, the rites of Easter in most Christian churches, as well as the Wiccan Ostara. The autumnal equinox is associated with the Jewish holiday of Sukkot and the Wiccan Mabon. 

In the southern tip of South America, the Mapuche people celebrate We Tripantu (the New Year) a few days after the northern solstice, on June 24. Further north, the Atacama people formerly celebrated this date with a noise festival, to call the Sun back. Further east, the Aymara people celebrate their New Year on June 21. A celebration occurs at sunrise, when the sun shines directly through the Gate of the Sun in Tiwanaku. Other Aymara New Year feasts occur throughout Bolivia, including at the site of El Fuerte de Samaipata.

In the Hindu calendar, two sidereal solstices are named Makara Sankranti which marks the start of Uttarayana and Karka Sankranti which marks the start of Dakshinayana. The former occurs around January 14 each year, while the latter occurs around July 14 each year. These mark the movement of the Sun along a sidereally fixed zodiac (precession is ignored) into Makara, the zodiacal sign which corresponds with Capricorn, and into Karka, the zodiacal sign which corresponds with Cancer, respectively.

The Amundsen–Scott South Pole Station celebrates every year on June 21 a midwinter party, to celebrate that the Sun is at its lowest point and coming back.

The Fremont Solstice Parade takes place every summer solstice in Fremont, Seattle, Washington in the United States.

The reconstructed Cahokia Woodhenge, a large timber circle located at the Mississippian culture Cahokia archaeological site near Collinsville, Illinois, is the site of annual equinox and solstice sunrise observances. Out of respect for Native American beliefs these events do not feature ceremonies or rituals of any kind.

Solstice determination
Unlike the equinox, the solstice time is not easy to determine. The changes in solar declination become smaller as the Sun gets closer to its maximum/minimum declination.

This difference is hardly detectable with indirect viewing based devices like sextant equipped with a vernier, and impossible with more traditional tools like a gnomon or an astrolabe. It is also hard to detect the changes in sunrise/sunset azimuth due to the atmospheric refraction changes. Those accuracy issues render it impossible to determine the solstice day based on observations made within the 3 (or even 5) days surrounding the solstice without the use of more complex tools.

Accounts do not survive but Greek astronomers must have used an approximation method based on interpolation, which is still used by some amateurs. This method consists of recording the declination angle at noon during some days before and after the solstice, trying to find two separate days with the same declination. When those two days are found, the halfway time between both noons is estimated solstice time. An interval of 45 days has been postulated as the best one to achieve up to a quarter-day precision, in the solstice determination.
In 2012, the journal DIO found that accuracy of one or two hours with balanced errors can be attained by observing the Sun's equal altitudes about S = twenty degrees (or d = about 20 days) before and after the summer solstice because the average of the two times will be early by q arc minutes where q is (πe cosA)/3 times the square of S in degrees (e = earth orbit eccentricity, A = earth's perihelion or Sun's apogee), and the noise in the result will be about 41 hours divided by d if the eye's sharpness is taken as one arc minute.

Astronomical almanacs define the solstices as the moments when the Sun passes through the solstitial colure, i.e. the times when the apparent geocentric celestial longitude of the Sun is equal to 90° (June solstice) or 270° (December solstice). The dates of the solstice varies each year and may occur a day earlier or later depending on the time zone. The solstices always occur between June 20 and 22 and between December 20 and 23 with the 21st and 22nd being the most common dates.

In the constellations 
Using the current official IAU constellation boundaries – and taking into account the variable precession speed and the rotation of the ecliptic – the solstices shift through the constellations as follows (expressed in astronomical year numbering in which the year 0 = 1 BC, −1 = 2 BC, etc.):
 The northern solstice passed from Leo into Cancer in year −1458, passed into Gemini in year −10, passed into Taurus in December 1989, and is expected to pass into Aries in year 4609.
 The southern solstice passed from Capricornus into Sagittarius in year −130, is expected to pass into Ophiuchus in year 2269, and is expected to pass into Scorpius in year 3597.

On other planets
The 687-day orbit of Mars around the Sun (almost twice that of the Earth) causes its summer and winter solstices to occur at approximately 23-month intervals.

See also 

 Analemma
 Geocentric view of the seasons
 Iranian calendars
 Perihelion and aphelion
 Wheel of the Year
 Zoroastrian calendar

References

External links 

 Equinoxes and Solstices Calculator (1600 to 2400)
 
 

Astronomical events of the Solar System
Calendars
December observances
Dynamics of the Solar System
June observances
Technical factors of astrology
Time in astronomy